The 2009 Biathlon Junior World Championships was held in Canmore, Canada from January 28 to February 3 2009. There was to be a total of 16 competitions: sprint, pursuit, individual, mass start, and relay races for men and women.

Medal winners

Youth Women

Junior Women

Youth Men

Junior Men

Medal table

References

External links
Official IBU website 

Biathlon Junior World Championships
2009 in biathlon
2009 in Canadian sports
International sports competitions hosted by Canada
2009 in youth sport